In Christianity, angels are the messengers of God.

General views

Antiquity 

As Augustine of Hippo remarks, the angels were experiencing something new as the creation of God unfolded. Augustine also considers that the 'good' angels seek at all times, to direct us towards the true source of happiness, God; that they encourage us in worship of God.

Pseudo-Dionysian hierarchy 

 
According to Pseudo-Dionysius the Areopagite's De Coelesti Hierarchia (On the Celestial Hierarchy), there are three levels ("sphere") of angels, inside each of which there are three orders. 

Various works of Christian theology have devised hierarchies of angelic beings. The most influential Christian angelic hierarchy was put forward around the turn of the 6th century CE by Pseudo-Dionysius in his work De Coelesti Hierarchia. He claimed to be an important figure who was converted by Paul the Apostle, and the Pseudo-Dionysius enjoyed greater influence than it would have if he had used his actual name, until Erasmus publicised doubts about the age of the work in the early 16th century.

Catholic Church 
According to the Catechism of the Catholic Church (CCC) paragraph 328, "the existence of the spiritual, non-corporeal beings that Sacred Scripture usually calls 'angels' is a truth of faith. The witness of Scripture is as clear as the unanimity of Tradition." The same catechism states: "The whole life of the church benefits from the mysterious and powerful help of the angels  [...] From its beginning until death, human life is surrounded by their watchful care and intercession." It also states, "Christ is the center of the angelic world. They are His angels [...] They belong to Him because they were created through and for Him".

Seraphim 

Tradition places seraphim in a rank in Christian angelology, based on Isaiah's usage of the word.

Cherubim 

In the Book of Ezekiel, and in some Christian icons, the cherub is depicted as having two pairs of wings, and four faces: that of a lion (representative of all wild animals), an ox (domestic animals), a human (humanity), and an eagle (birds). Their legs were straight, the soles of their feet like the hooves of a bull, gleaming like polished brass. Later tradition ascribes to them a variety of physical appearances. In Western Christian tradition, cherubim have become associated with the putto (derived from classical Cupid/Eros), resulting in depictions of cherubim as small, plump, winged boys.

Thrones 

One of the Dead Sea scrolls (4Q405) construes them as angels.

Dominions or Lordships 
The Dominions (lat. dominatio, plural dominationes, also translated from the Greek term kyriotētes, pl. of kyriotēs, as "Lordships") or "Dominations" are presented as the hierarchy of celestial beings "Lordships".

Virtues 
According to The Etymologies of Isidore of Seville, the Virtues are known for their control of the elements. In addition to being the spirits of motion, they also assist in governing nature. They also assist with miracles, as well as encourage humans to strengthen their faith in God.

Powers or Authorities 
In The Etymologies of Isidore of Seville, the Powers (lat. potestas (f), pl. potestates) (Greek: ἐξουσίαι) are given their name because they are angels who have power over evil forces, which the angels are able to restrain to keep them from doing harm.

Principalities or Rulers 
According to The Etymologies of Isidore of Seville, the Principalities, also translated as "Princedoms" and "Rulers", from the Greek archai, pl. of archē (see Greek root in Eph 3:10), are the angels that guide and protect nations, or groups of peoples, and institutions such as the Church. The Principalities preside over the bands of angels and charge them with fulfilling the divine ministry. There are some who administer and some who assist.

Archangels 

In most Christian traditions Gabriel is also considered an archangel, but there is no direct literary support for this assumption. The term archangel appears only in the singular, never plural, and only in specific reference to Michael.

The name of the archangel Raphael appears only in the Book of Tobit (Tobias).

The Holy See's 2001 Directory on popular piety states: "The practice of assigning names to the Holy Angels should be discouraged, except in the cases of Gabriel, Raphael and Michael whose names are contained in Holy Scripture".

Guardian angels 

Some Christian denominations believe that guardian angels exist.

See also 
 Classification of demons
 Christian demonology
 Dynamics of the celestial spheres
 Fallen angel
 Heavenly host
 List of angels in theology
 Angels in Islam
 Angels in Judaism
 Ye Watchers and Ye Holy Ones
 Yazata
 List of films about angels

References

Sources

Further reading 
 C. A. Patrides. "On the orders of angels" (Chapter one). Premises and Motifs in Renaissance Thought and Literature (Princeton, 1982). .
 Barker, Margaret. An Extraordinary Gathering of Angels. M Q Publications, 2004.
 Copeland, Mark. Ministering Spirits: Angels In The Old Testament. Executable Outlines. 2004.
 Copeland, Mark. Terms And Descriptions Of Angels. Executable Outlines. 2004.
 Fares, Aymen. Angelics and the Angelic Realm. Spiritual.com.au Pty. Ltd. 2000.
 Tatum, Johnny. The Hierarchy of Angels: Hierarchical Chart of Angels. Worldnet Grace Ministries.
 Tatum, Johnny. The Hierarchy of Angels: Distinguishing the Higher Ranked. Worldnet Grace Ministries.
 Pseudo-Dionysus the Areopagite. The Celestial Hierarchy.